Lin Chih-chien (born 27 May 1975) is a Taiwanese politician. He was the Mayor of Hsinchu City from 25 December 2014 to 8 July 2022.

Early life and education
Lin earned his bachelor's degree in business administration followed by a master's degree in technology management from Chung Hua University's College of Management in 2008. In 2017, he obtained a second master's degree from National Taiwan University's Graduate Institute of National Development, where his thesis discussed the 2014 Hsinchu mayoral elections. Both master's degrees were rescinded by the respective institutions after investigations confirmed that Lin had plagiarized his theses for the two degrees.

Mayor of Hsinchu City

2014 Hsinchu City mayoralty election
Lin was elected as the Mayor of Hsinchu City after narrowly winning the 2014 Hsinchu City mayoralty election held on 29 November 2014.

2018 Hsinchu City mayoralty election
Lin won reelection in 2018.

Later political career
Being term limited for the Hsinchu City mayoralty, Lin proposed consolidating Hsinchu City and County to form a special municipality, though he stated in December 2021 that he would not contest the mayoralty for this proposed entity during the 2022 local elections. In June 2022, he accepted the Democratic Progressive Party nomination for the Taoyuan mayoralty. The following month, Taipei City Councilor  claimed that Lin had plagiarized a research paper cowritten by Lee Yu-cheng and Wang Ming-lang while completing his master's degree at Chung Hua University's College of Management. Lin's adviser Ho Li-hsing and researcher Wang Ming-lang both signed written statements that asserted Lin had been on Wang Ming-lang's research team. Lin's second master's degree, obtained at National Taiwan University's Graduate Institute of National Development, was called into question by political commentator Huang Yang-ming. Huang suggested that Lin had plagiarized from Yu Cheng-huang, while Lin and Chen Ming-tong, Lin's adviser at NTU, stated that Yu had utilized research material collected by Lin. National Taiwan University began  into the allegations. The committee found that Lin plagiarized from Yu, and advised that Lin's master's degree be revoked  National Taiwan University duly revoked his master's degree on 9 August 2022. Lin withdrew his nomination for the Taoyuan mayoralty on 12 August 2022. After the conclusion of investigations, Chung Hua University also revoked his master's degree on 24 August 2022.

References

External links

 

1975 births
Living people
Democratic Progressive Party (Taiwan) politicians
Mayors of Hsinchu
People involved in plagiarism controversies
National Taiwan University alumni